St. Panteleimon Football Club is a football club based in Greenford, Greater London, England.

History
The club was founded on 16 May 2015, for the Greek Orthodox community in London. St. Panteleimon initially competed in the KOPA League, before joining the Middlesex Football League. The club entered the FA Vase for the first time in 2018–19, beating Holmer Green 3–1 in their first match in the competition on 1 September 2018.

After winning the Premier Division of the Middlesex County League in 2018–19, the club were promoted to Division One of the Spartan South Midlands League. In 2021 the club were promoted to the Premier Division North of the Combined Counties League based on their results in the abandoned 2019–20 and 2020–21 seasons.

Ground
The club currently groundshares with Hertford Town F.C. at Hertingfordbury Park, having previously played at The Hive Stadium's facilities and groundsharing with Edgware Town at Silver Jubilee Park.

Honours
Middlesex County League
Premier Division Champions (1) 2018–19 
Division One (Central & East) champions (1) 2017–18
The Alec Smith Premier Division Cup Winners (1) 2018–19

Records
Best league position: 1st in the Middlesex County League Division One (Central & East), 2017–18
Best FA Vase performance: First round, 2018–19

References

External links
Official website

Association football clubs established in 2015
2015 establishments in England
Football clubs in England
Football clubs in London
Middlesex County Football League
Sport in the London Borough of Harrow
Sport in the London Borough of Ealing
Spartan South Midlands Football League
Diaspora sports clubs in the United Kingdom
Combined Counties Football League
Diaspora association football clubs in England